Gearbreakers is a novel written by American novelist Zoe Hana Mikuta. It was first published by Feiwel & Friends an imprint of Macmillan Publishers.

References 

2021 speculative fiction novels
Feiwel & Friends books